The 1976 Australian Open was a tennis tournament played on outdoor grass courts at the Kooyong Lawn Tennis Club in Melbourne in Australia and was held from 26 December 1975 to 4 January 1976.  It was the 64th edition of the Australian Open and the first Grand Slam tournament of the year. The singles titles were won by Australians Mark Edmondson and Evonne Goolagong Cawley.

Seniors

Men's singles

 Mark Edmondson defeated  John Newcombe, 6–7, 6–3, 7–6, 6–1 
 It was Edmondson's 1st and only career Grand Slam singles title. Edmondson is the lowest ranked player ever to win a Grand Slam event.

Women's singles

 Evonne Goolagong Cawley defeated  Renáta Tomanová, 6–2, 6–2 
 It was Goolagong's 5th career Grand Slam singles title and her 3rd title at the Australian Open.

Men's doubles

 John Newcombe /  Tony Roche defeated  Ross Case /  Geoff Masters, 7–6, 6–4

Women's doubles

 Evonne Goolagong Cawley /  Helen Gourlay Cawley defeated  Lesley Turner Bowrey /  Renáta Tomanová, 8–1 
• It was Goolagong's 5th career Grand Slam doubles title and her 4th title at the Australian Open.
• It was Gourlay's 2nd career Grand Slam doubles title and her 2nd title at the Australian Open.

Mixed doubles
No competition between 1970 and 1986.

References

External links

 
 
December 1975 sports events in Australia
January 1976 sports events in Australia
1976,Australian Open